The 2016 Latvian Higher League was the 25th season of top-tier football in Latvia. FK Liepāja were the defending champions. The season began on 11 March 2016 and ended on 5 November 2016; the relegation play-offs took place on 9 and 13 November 2016.

Teams 
FB Gulbene were excluded from the previous season due to suspicion of match-fixing. 2015 Latvian First League winners FC Caramba/Dinamo were promoted to the league and before the season changed their name to Riga FC.

Skonto FC did not obtain a license to play in the 2016 Higher League. Skonto appealed the decision, but the appeal was denied. Since 2015 Latvian First League runners-up Valmiera Glass FK/BSS turned down the opportunity to be promoted to the Higher League, third-placed Rīgas Futbola skola (RFS) was promoted instead.

Stadiums and locations

Kits manufacturer and sponsors

League table

Relegation play-offs
The 7th-placed side, FS METTA/LU, faced AFA Olaine, runners-up of the 2016 Latvian First League in a two-legged play-off, with the winner being awarded a spot in the 2017 Higher League competition.

First Leg

Second Leg

METTA/LU won 2–1 on aggregate and retained their place in the 2017 Higher League.

Results

Season statistics

Top scorers

Updated to match(es) played on 29 October 2016. Source:UEFA

References

External links
Official website 

Latvian Higher League seasons
1
Latvia
Latvia